Torbjørn Agdestein (born 29 November 1991) is a Norwegian professional footballer who currently plays as a striker for Stord IL.

Club career

Stord IL
Agdestein started his career at Stord IL, playing 35 games and scoring 16 goals.

Brighton & Hove Albion
In 2010, Agdestein was transferred to English club Brighton & Hove Albion for an undisclosed fee and featured in the development squad. Agdestein made his first competitive appearance for Brighton during an FA Cup 3rd round replay against Wrexham. Three days later, he made his first league appearance for Brighton coming on as a second-half substitute and providing an assist to Will Buckley in a 2–1 victory at Peterborough United. Towards the end of the 2010–11 season, Agdestein had his Brighton contract extended for one-year.

During September 2011, Agdestein joined Conference National side Bath City on loan. However, making three appearances, Agdestein returned to Brighton.

Following his return from Bath City, Agdestein soon played regularly in the reserve team and in March 2012, signed a two-year contract.

On 26 July 2013, Agdestein left Brighton after his contract was terminated by mutual consent despite having one-year left to run.

Inverness Caledonian Thistle
Agdestein signed for Inverness CT in July 2013 on a six- month contract, the club beating off competition from Viking. However, Agdestein suffered a lack of playing time due to the form of Billy McKay and only made one start. Despite a desire to sign a new contract, Agdestein left the club when his contract expired and his agent said he was in talks with English clubs.

Haugesund
After leaving Scotland and not getting a  move to England, Agdestein returned to Norway, where he joined Tippeligaen side Haugesund.

On 30 March, he signed a loan deal with Norwegian First Division club Kristiansund.

After breaking into the first team squad he earned the title as the club's top goalscorer in his final Haugesund season after bagging 10 league goals.

Odd
He signed for Odd on the 17 August on a three-year deal. Agdestein only earned 7 league appearances and failed to score a single league goal. He did, however, score a hat-trick against IL Hei in the first round of the 2017 Norwegian Football Cup.

Aalesund
Before the 2018 season he signed for second-tier side Aalesunds FK on a three-year deal. Following a lengthy injury, rupturing both his left and right cruciate ligament in succession, he was released in the summer of 2021. He moved home and signed for Stord IL.

International career
On 22 February 2012 it was announced Agdestein had been called up to the Norway under-21 national team for the first time, ahead of their friendly with Slovenia. He was capped once.

Career statistics

Club

References

External links
Player profile on Brighton & Hove Albion official website

1991 births
Living people
People from Stord
Norwegian footballers
Association football forwards
Brighton & Hove Albion F.C. players
Bath City F.C. players
Inverness Caledonian Thistle F.C. players
FK Haugesund players
Kristiansund BK players
Odds BK players
Aalesunds FK players
English Football League players
National League (English football) players
Eliteserien players
Norwegian First Division players
Norwegian expatriate footballers
Expatriate footballers in England
Norwegian expatriate sportspeople in England
Expatriate footballers in Scotland
Norwegian expatriate sportspeople in Scotland
Scottish Professional Football League players
Norway under-21 international footballers
Sportspeople from Vestland